National Highway 709AD, commonly called Panipat-Khatima Highway is a national highway in  India.
It is a spur road of National Highway 9. NH-709AD traverses the states of Uttar Pradesh and Haryana passes through various 
Cities and Town in Haryana and Western Uttar Pradesh like Shamli, Muzaffarnagar, Bijnor in India before its terminal at Nagina in Bijnor. Shamli acts as one of the major junction as two other major highways of the area (709A) and (709B) intersects with (709AD) at Shamli. The other major junction is Muzaffarnagar where this highway intersects with (334) Delhi-Rishikesh National Highway and UP State Highway 59

Route 
Panipat - Shamli - Muzaffarnagar - Jansath - Meerapur - Bijnor - Nagina.

Junctions list  

  Terminal near Panipat.
  near Shamli. 
  near Shamli.
  near Muzaffarnagar.
  near Miranpur.  
  near Bijnor. 
  Terminal near Nagina

References

National highways in India
National Highways in Haryana